Saint Vincent and the Grenadines competed at the 2019 World Aquatics Championships in Gwangju, South Korea from 12 to 28 July.

Swimming

Saint Vincent and the Grenadines entered three swimmers.

Men

Women

References

Nations at the 2019 World Aquatics Championships
Saint Vincent and the Grenadines at the World Aquatics Championships
World Aquatics Championships